Transcutaneous electrical nerve stimulation (TENS or TNS) is the use of electric current produced by a device to stimulate the nerves for therapeutic purposes. TENS, by definition, covers the complete range of transcutaneously applied currents used for nerve excitation although the term is often used with a more restrictive intent, namely to describe the kind of pulses produced by portable stimulators used to reduce pain. The unit is usually connected to the skin using two or more electrodes which are typically conductive gel pads. A typical battery-operated TENS unit is able to modulate pulse width, frequency, and intensity.  Generally, TENS is applied at high frequency (>50 Hz) with an intensity below motor contraction (sensory intensity) or low frequency (<10 Hz) with an intensity that produces motor contraction. More recently, many TENS units use a mixed frequency mode which alleviates tolerance to repeated use. Intensity of stimulation should be strong but comfortable with greater intensities, regardless of frequency, producing the greatest analgesia.  While the use of TENS has proved effective in clinical studies, there is controversy over which conditions the device should be used to treat.

Medical uses

Pain
Transcutaneous electrical nerve stimulation is a commonly used treatment approach to alleviate acute and chronic pain by reducing the sensitization of dorsal horn neurons, elevating levels of gamma-aminobutyric acid and glycine, and inhibiting glial activation. However, many systematic reviews and meta analyses assessing clinical trials looking at the effectiveness of using TENS to reduce different sources of pain have been inconclusive due to a lack of high quality and unbiased evidence. Potential benefits of TENS treatment include the safety, relative low cost, the ability to self-administer, and availability over the counter without a prescription. In principle, an adequate intensity of stimulation is necessary to achieve pain relief with TENS. An analysis of treatment fidelity (meaning that the delivery of TENS in a trial was in accordance with current clinical advice, such as using "a strong but comfortable sensation" and suitable, frequent treatment durations) showed that higher fidelity trials tended to have a positive outcome.

Acute pain 
For people with recent onset pain (less than three months) such as pain associated with surgery, trauma, and/or medical procedures, TENS may be better than placebo in some cases, however the evidence of benefit is very weak.

Musculoskeletal and neck/back pain 
There is some evidence to support a benefit of using TENS in chronic musculoskeletal pain. Results from a task force on neck pain in 2008, found no clinically significant benefit to TENS for the treatment of neck pain when compared to a placebo treatment. A 2010 review did not find evidence to support the use of TENS for chronic low back pain.

Another study examining Knee Osteoarthritis (KOA) patients supported that TENS demonstrated a better efficacy and safety profile than Weak Opiates. Given the age and comorbidities of the KOA population being generally older, often prone to polypharmacy and sensitive to adverse reactions, TENS could be a relevant non-pharmacological therapeutic alternative to pharmacological analgesics for the management of Knee Osteoarthritis pain.

Neuropathy and phantom limb pain 
There is tentative evidence that it may be useful for painful diabetic neuropathy. As of 2015, the efficacy of TENS therapy for phantom limb pain is not known as no randomized controlled trials have been performed.

A few studies have shown objective evidence that TENS may modulate or suppress pain signals in the brain. One used evoked cortical potentials to show that electric stimulation of peripheral A-beta sensory fibers reliably suppressed A-delta fiber nociceptive (pain perception) processing. Two other studies used functional magnetic resonance imaging (fMRI): one showed that high-frequency TENS produced a decrease in pain-related cortical activations in patients with carpal tunnel syndrome, while the other showed that low-frequency TENS decreased shoulder impingement pain and modulated pain-induced activation in the brain.

Labor and menstrual pain
Earlier studies have stated that TENS "has been shown not to be effective in postoperative and labour pain." These studies also had questionable ability to truly blind the patients. However, more recent studies have shown that TENS was "effective for relieving labour pain, and they are well considered by pregnant participants." One study also showed that there was a significant change in how soon the laboring mothers took to request pharmacologic pain management, like the epidural. The group with the TENS waited five additional hours. Both groups were satisfied with the pain relief that they had from their choices. No maternal, infant, or labor problems were noted. There is tentative evidence that TENS may be helpful for treating pain from dysmenorrhoea, however further research is required.

Cancer pain 
Non-pharmacological treatment options for people experiencing pain caused by cancer are much needed, however, it is not clear from the weak studies that have been published if TENS is an effective approach.

Bladder Function 
Percutaneous and transcutaneous electrical nerve stimulation in the tibial nerve have been used in the treatment of overactive bladder and urinary retention. Sometimes it is also done in the sacrum.
Systematic review studies have shown limited evidence on the effectiveness, and more quality research is needed. A major trial found that in a care home context transcutaneous posterior tibial nerve stimulation did not improve urinary incontinence.

Dentistry 
TENS has been extensively used in non-odontogenic orofacial pain relief. In addition, TENS and ultra low frequency-TENS (ULF-TENS) are commonly employed in diagnosis and treatment of temporomandibular joint dysfunction (TMD). Further clinical studies are required to determine its efficacy.

Tremor 
A wearable neuromodulation device that delivers electrical stimulation to nerves in the wrist is now available by prescription. Worn around the wrist, it acts as a non-invasive treatment for those living with essential tremor. The stimulator has electrodes that are placed circumferentially around a patient's wrist. Positioning the electrodes on generally opposing sides of the target nerve can result in improved stimulation of the nerve. In clinical trials reductions in hand tremors were reported following noninvasive median and radial nerve stimulation.

Transcutaneous Afferent Patterned Stimulation (TAPS) is a tremor-customized therapy, based on the patient's measured tremor frequency, and is delivered transcutaneously to the median and radial nerves of a patient's wrist. The patient specific TAPS stimulation is determined through a calibration process performed by the accelerometer and microprocessor on the device.

The Cala ONE delivers TAPS in a wrist-worn device that is calibrated to treat tremor symptoms. Cala ONE received de novo FDA clearance in April 2018 for the transient relief of hand tremors in adults with essential tremor and is currently marketed as Cala Trio.

Contraindications 
People who have implanted electronic medical devices including pacemakers and cardiodefibrillators are not suggested to use TENS. In addition, caution should be taken before using TENS in those who are pregnant, have epilepsy, have an active malignancy, have deep vein thrombosis, have skin that is damaged, or are frail.

Side effects 
Overall, TENS has been found to be safe compared with pharmaceutical medications for treating pain. Potential side effects include skin itching near the electrodes and mild redness of the skin (erythema). Some people also report that they dislike the sensation associated with TENS.

TENS device types 
The TENS device acts to stimulate the sensory nerves and a small portion of the peripheral motor nerves; the stimulation causes multiple mechanisms to trigger and manage the sense of pain in a patient. TENS operates by two main mechanisms: it stimulates competing sensory neurons at the pain perception gate, and it stimulates the opiate response. The mechanism that will be used varies with the type of device.

The table below lists the types of devices:

History
Electrical stimulation for pain control was used in ancient Rome, in AD 63. It was reported by Scribonius Largus that pain was relieved by standing on an electrical fish at the seashore. In the 16th through the 18th centuries various electrostatic devices were used for headache and other pains. Benjamin Franklin was a proponent of this method for pain relief. In the 19th century a device called the electreat, along with numerous other devices were used for pain control and cancer cures. Only the electreat survived into the 20th century, but was not portable, and had limited control of the stimulus. Development of the modern TENS unit is generally credited to C. Norman Shealy.

Modern
The first modern, patient-wearable TENS was patented in the United States in 1974. It was initially used for testing the tolerance of chronic pain patients to electrical stimulation before implantation of electrodes in the spinal cord dorsal column. The electrodes were attached to an implanted receiver, which received its power from an antenna worn on the surface of the skin. Although intended only for testing tolerance to electrical stimulation, many of the patients said they received so much relief from the TENS itself that they never returned for the implant.

A number of companies began manufacturing TENS units after the commercial success of the Medtronic device became known. The neurological division of Medtronic, founded by Don Maurer, Ed Schuck and Charles Ray, developed a number of applications for implanted electrical stimulation devices for treatment of epilepsy, Parkinson's disease, and other disorders of the nervous system.

Today many people confuse TENS with electrical muscle stimulation (EMS). EMS and TENS devices look similar, with both using long electric lead wires and electrodes. TENS is for blocking pain, where EMS is for stimulating muscles.

Research 
As reported, TENS has different effects on the brain. A randomized controlled trial in 2017 shown that sensory ULF-TENS applied on the skin proximally to trigeminal nerve, reduced the effect of acute mental stress assessed by heart rate variability (HRV). Further high quality studies are required to determine the effectiveness of TENS for treating dementia.

A head-mounted TENS device called Cefaly was approved by the United States Food and Drug Administration (FDA), in March 2014, for the prevention of migraines. The Cefaly device was found effective in preventing migraine attacks in a randomized sham-controlled trial. This was the first TENS device the FDA approved for pain prevention, as opposed to pain suppression.

A study performed on healthy human subjects demonstrates that repeated application of TENS can generate analgesic tolerance within five days, reducing its efficacy. The study noted that TENS causes the release of endogenous opioids, and that the analgesia is likely due to opioid tolerance mechanisms.

The pain reduction ability of TENS is so far, unconfirmed by sufficient randomized controlled trials. One meta-analysis of several hundred TENS studies concluded that there was a significant overall reduction of pain intensity due to TENS, but there were too few participants and controls to be entirely certain of their validity. Therefore, the authors downgraded their confidence in the results by two levels, to low-certainty.

Safety
There are several anatomical locations where TENS electrodes are contraindicated:
 Over the eyes due to the risk of increasing intraocular pressure
 Transcerebrally
 On the front of the neck due to the risk of an acute hypotension (through a vasovagal response) or even a laryngospasm
 Through the chest using anterior and posterior electrode positions, or other transthoracic applications understood as "across a thoracic diameter"; this does not preclude coplanar applications
 Internally, except for specific applications of dental, vaginal, and anal stimulation that employ specialized TENS units
 On broken skin areas or wounds, although it can be placed around wounds
 Over a tumor/malignancy (based on in vitro experiments where electricity promotes cell growth)
 Directly over the spinal column

TENS used across an artificial cardiac pacemaker (or other indwelling stimulator, including across its leads) may cause interference and failure of the implanted device. Serious accidents have been recorded in cases when this principle was not observed. A 2009 review in this area suggests that electrotherapy, including TENS, is "best avoided" in patients with pacemakers or implantable cardioverter-defibrillators (ICDs). They add that "there is no consensus and it may be possible to safely deliver these modalities in a proper setting with device and patient monitoring", and recommend further research. The review found several reports of ICDs administering inappropriate treatment due to interference with TENS devices, but notes that the reports on pacemakers are mixed: some non-programmable pacemakers were inhibited by TENS, but others were unaffected or auto-reprogrammed.

The use of TENS is likely to be less effective on areas of numb skin or decreased sensation due to nerve damage. It may also cause skin irritation due to the inability to feel currents until they are too high. There is an unknown level of risk when placing electrodes over an infection (possible spreading due to muscle contractions), but cross contamination with the electrodes themselves is of greater concern. TENS should also be used with caution in people with epilepsy or pregnant women; do not use over area of the uterus as the effects of electrical stimulation over the developing fetus are not known.

See also 
 Electroacupuncture
 Electrical muscle stimulation
 Microcurrent electrical neuromuscular stimulator
 Erotic electrostimulation - for sexual uses of TENS devices

References 

Books cited

Further reading 

 
 
 
 

Electrotherapy
Neurotechnology
Medical equipment
Pain management